Willem Johan Lucas Grobbée (9 April 1822, in Zwolle – 6 April 1907, in The Hague) was a Dutch politician.

Grobbée, who had been tax inspector, became Minister of Finance in the conservative cabinet of Jan Heemskerk in 1883. He was the 14th candidate for that function and turned out to be ineffective in that role. He resigned after two years when the House of Representatives had rejected his proposals for finance improvements, which, for the first time in Dutch history, included a form of income tax.

References
W.J.L. Grobbée at www.parlement.com

1822 births
1907 deaths
Ministers of Finance of the Netherlands
People from Zwolle
Commanders of the Order of the Netherlands Lion